Jamal Al-Dhefiri (born 8 September 1992) is a Saudi professional footballer who plays as a center back for Al-Nairyah.

External links

References

1992 births
Living people
Saudi Arabian footballers
Al Batin FC players
Al-Qaisumah FC players
Al-Tadamon SC (Saudi Arabia) players
Arar FC players
Al-Riyadh SC players
Al-Nairyah Club players
Saudi First Division League players
Saudi Professional League players
Saudi Fourth Division players
Saudi Second Division players
Association football defenders